William Lofgren (born July 31, 1948) is an American former professional tennis player.

A native of Peoria, Illinois, Lofgren played collegiate tennis for Bradley University was the Missouri Valley Conference singles champion in 1968. During the 1970s he was active on the professional tennis tour and featured at all four grand slam tournaments. He has had a long association with tennis in the city of Cincinnati, coaching at the Queen City Racquet Club in Glendale. In 2004 he was inducted into the Cincinnati Tennis Hall of Fame.

References

External links
 
 

1948 births
Living people
American male tennis players
Tennis people from Illinois
Bradley Braves athletes
College men's tennis players in the United States